Burabay District is a district of Aqmola Region in northern Kazakhstan. The administrative center of the district is the town of Shchuchinsk. Population:  

Prior to September 3, 2009, Burabay District was known as Shchuchinsk District.

Geography 
The district lies in the Kokshetau Hills. The surrounding area is part of the Burabay National Park. Burabay spa town is located in the strip of land between lakes Burabay and Shchuchye.

References

External links

Districts of Kazakhstan
Akmola Region